Amymoma is a genus of beetles in the family Cerambycidae, containing a single species, Amymoma pulchella. It was described by Francis Polkinghorne Pascoe in 1866.

References

Desmiphorini
Beetles described in 1866
Monotypic Cerambycidae genera
Taxa named by Francis Polkinghorne Pascoe